AIFL may refer to:
 American Indoor Football Association, professional indoor football league
 America–Israel Friendship League, an American/Israeli non-profit
 The Art Institute of Fort Lauderdale, art and culinary school